Mrkopalj is a village and a municipality in the mountainous part of Croatia in the region of Gorski Kotar, located south-east of Delnice and some 50 km east of Rijeka and 831 meters above sea level. In 2011 the municipality had 1,214 inhabitants, the majority of whom are Croats.

Industry
Mrkopalj was once a relatively important trading town in the Gorski Kotar highlands where timber and sheep are the main resources.

Mountain snow sports are popular.

Coat of arms
Emperor Joseph II granted the Coat of Arms and the status of a free royal market town in 1785. The grant of arms is similar in style with others granted in the period, including the aquarel picture of the Coat of Arms within a ring containing the inscription (thus making it a seal) and set in a baroque scene with mountains, angel broquate covers, coats of arms of selected Habsburg lands.

The shield is party per fess chief per pale: first chequy gules and argent, second or a lamb passant below a fir tree vert trunked proper issuant from a base also vert, and third azure five cliff spikes argent. The modern community adopted (around 1995) the same coat of arms in a modernized artistic rendition as required by regulations.

The decision on adoption of the coat of arms for Mrkopalj and the flag was adopted on 12 March 1998 and this was issued in the official gazette in May 1998: Odluka o grbu i zastavi Opcine Mrkopalj, 12.03.1998, Službene novine Primorsko-goranske županije, br. 11/98, 29. svibnja 1998.

The flag is dark blue with the coat of arms bordered yellow in the middle.

Notable residents
Jakov Fak, Olympic biathlete
Nada Birko, Olympic cross-country skier

In popular culture
American author Jennifer Wilson's 2011 non-fiction book, Running Away to Home: Our Family's Journey to Croatia in Search of Who We Are, Where We Came From, and What Really Matters, takes place in Mrkopalj. She and her husband and two children spent seven months in the village, to reconnect to her immigrant maternal grandparents' relatives and culture.

References

External links

Municipalities of Croatia
Populated places in Primorje-Gorski Kotar County